I Saw Ramallah is an Arabic language autobiographical book written by Palestinian writer and poet Mourid Barghouti. The English translation of this book was first published in 2000 by the American University in Cairo Press, and later on 16 May 2005 by Bloomsbury. Ahdaf Soueif translated the book to English

Synopsis 
In 1966 Mourid Barghouti went to Cairo, Egypt for higher studies. In 1967, after the Six-Day War, when he came back to Palestine after completing his studies, he was barred to enter the country. Like many others he started living abroad. Thirty years later, after continuous struggle, he was allowed to enter Ramallah, his own hometown, where he was born and grown up.

Reviews 
Edward Said told, the book was "one of the finest existential accounts of Palestinian displacement that we now have". The Guardian review said that the novel "is an intensely lyrical account of the poet's return to his hometown".

References 

1997 non-fiction books
Books about Palestinians
Ramallah